Helal Mohammed (Arabic:هلال محمد) (born 23 May 1993) is a Qatari footballer. He currently plays for Al-Khor.

References

Qatari footballers
1993 births
Living people
Al Sadd SC players
Al-Khor SC players
Umm Salal SC players
Al-Arabi SC (Qatar) players
Qatar Stars League players
Association football wingers